Schoenoplectus etuberculatus, common name Canby's bulrush, is a plant species native to the United States. It is reported from every state on the Gulf and Atlantic coasts from eastern Texas to Delaware, plus isolated populations in Rhode Island (one population in Town of South Kingstown, Washington County) and Missouri (Oregon County). It is an emergent plant growing in ponds, marshes, stream banks, etc., including in brackish water along the coast.

Schoenoplectus etuberculatus is a mat-forming perennial herb spreading by means of underground rhizomes. Leaves are up to 20 cm  (8 inches) long. Inflorescence is branched 2 or 3 times, bearing spikelets that are red, orange or straw-colored. Achenes are egg-shaped, about 4 mm (about 0.16 inches)across.

References

etuberculatus
Flora of the United States
Plants described in 1855